Oregon House may refer to:
Oregon House of Representatives, U.S.
Oregon House, California, a small community in California, U.S.